was a town located in Hikawa District, Shimane Prefecture, Japan.

As of 2003, the town had an estimated population of 27,246 and a density of 337.87 persons per km². The total area was 80.64 km².

On October 1, 2011, Hikawa was merged into the expanded city of Izumo and no longer exists as an independent municipality. Hikawa District was dissolved as a result of this merger.

Izumo Airport is located in the former territory of Hikawa.

External links

Izumo official website 

Dissolved municipalities of Shimane Prefecture